The Reefs of Space is a dystopian science fiction novel by American writers Frederik Pohl and Jack Williamson, published in 1964. It is part of the Starchild Trilogy, the other books in the series being Starchild (1965) and Rogue Star (1969).

Plot
The novel is set in a dystopian future where mankind is ruled by a brutal totalitarian government known as the Plan of Man, enforced by a computerized surveillance state. The main character is a genius scientist, Steve Ryeland, who is trying to build a new type of rocket drive. While Ryeland is struggling with amnesia, he has a computer companion named Oporto. Due to Ryeland's anti-government actions in the past, the Plan of Man Computer deems him to be a security risk, so he is forced to wear a bomb-equipped collar, which he is hoping to be able to remove.

Reception
Joachim Boaz's review in Science Fiction and Other Suspect Ruminations calls it "an enjoyable read" and he praises the "quick prose", action, and dialogue that keeps the reader interested.

References

Book series introduced in 1964
Science fiction novel trilogies
1964 science fiction novels
Collaborative novels
Novels by Frederik Pohl
Novels by Jack Williamson
Dystopian novels
Novels about artificial intelligence
Novels about totalitarianism
Novels about mass surveillance
Government by algorithm in fiction